The 1938 season of the Primera División Peruana, the top category of Peruvian football, was played by 9 teams. The national champions were Deportivo Municipal. Because Alianza Lima and Mariscal Sucre tied on points a relegation playoff took place. From 1931 until 1942 the points system was W:3, D:2, L:1, walkover:0.

Results

Standings

Relegation play-off

External links 
 Peru 1938 season at RSSSF
 Peruvian Football League News 

Peru1
Peruvian Primera División seasons
1938 in Peruvian football